The Canadian Youth Climate Coalition (CYCC) is a nonprofit youth organisation in Canada. The coalition consists of various youth organisations, which includes the Canadian Federation of Students, the Canadian Labour Congress, Sierra Youth Coalition, and others.  The charity aims to prioritize climate change as a societal issue.  Internationally, the coalition is part of the Global Youth Climate Movement.

History 
In September 2006, 48 youth organizations from across Canada met to discuss climate change and formed the Canadian Youth Climate Coalition. The coalition acts as a pressure group, to encourage politicians to act on the issue of climate change. Two months after its foundation, all Members of Parliament from the New Democratic Party signed onto the Canadian Youth Climate Coalition Declaration, which is a petition to the Canadian government to act on climate change.

Campaigns 

Canadian Youth Delegation 

From 2007 to 2011, the Canadian Youth Climate has organised a youth delegation to the United Nations Climate Change Conferences to deliver the voice of the Canadian youth climate movement. At the event in 2007, a member of the Canadian youth delegation delivered a speech on behalf of Greenpeace Solar Generation, Environnement Jeunesse, SustainUS, the Australian Youth Climate Coalition as well as the Canadian Youth Climate Coalition, to representatives from over 150 nations. A group of 20 young Canadians was selected to go to COP17 in Durban.

Power Shift 
The Canadian Youth Climate Coalition also organized the Canadian PowerShift conference in 2009 and 2011 and delivered Power Summer training camps across the country in 2010.

Power Summer

Each camp includes training in popular education, action & strategy, communications, messaging, campaign planning, and other quintessential organizing skills, while building our understanding of climate justice and how we build a movement to get it. These three-day, weekend long camps will use participatory, direct education to train the next generation of climate advocates.

Our Demands

The CYCC is inviting all Canadians to join in supporting our demands and demanding responsible action from our politicians. The demands are simple; justice across generations and peoples, youth participation in government decision making, just transition to a green economy and energy for today, tomorrow and the future. 
All 306 members of parliament have been formally invited to endorse the document; at present time Elizabeth May(Green Party of Canada), Megan Leslie (New Democratic Party), Justin Trudeau (Liberal Party of Canada) among others have pledged their support and commitment. These politicians join famous Canadians and organizations like David Suzuki, Brigette DePape, Maude Barlow, the Council of Canadians, Polaris Institute, Canadian Auto Workers and many others. The 'Our Demands' document is also featured in the Meet Your Member Campaign.

Meet Your Member 

The CYCC has organized a campaign encouraging youth to meet with their members of parliament to make sure that our government knows that youth are engaged, and are taking a stand for a just, sustainable future.

See also 
Australian Youth Climate Coalition
Community youth development
Energy Action Coalition
Indian Youth Climate Network
UK Youth Climate Coalition
Youth Climate Movement

References

External links 
Canadian Youth Climate Coalition

Environmental organizations based in Canada
Youth empowerment organizations
Climate change in Canada
Climate change organizations